This is a list of Members of Parliament elected in the 1965 Northern Ireland general election.

All members of the Northern Ireland House of Commons elected at the 1965 Northern Ireland general election are listed.

Members

Changes
23 November 1966: Robert Wilson Porter of the Ulster Unionist Party was elected for Queen's University to replace independent MP Charles Stewart.
25 May 1967: Michael Keogh of the Nationalist Party was elected in South Down to replace Joseph Connellan.
22 March 1968: John Brooke of the Ulster Unionist Party was elected in Lisnaskea to replace his father, Basil Brooke.
16 May 1968: Albert Anderson of the Ulster Unionist Party was elected in City of Londonderry to replace Edward Warburton Jones.
6 November 1968: Richard Ferguson of the Ulster Unionist Party was elected in South Antrim to replace Brian McConnell.

References
Biographies of Members of the Northern Ireland House of Commons

1965